Edinburgh Castle was an ocean liner operated by the Union-Castle Line in service between Britain and South Africa during the mid 20th century. She and her sister ship the RMS Pretoria Castle were built to replace the Warwick Castle which was lost during World War 2.

She was built by Harland and Wolff of Belfast at a cost of £2.5 million, and was launched on 16 October 1947, by Princess Margaret. She made her maiden voyage in November 1948. She was refitted twice in the mid 1960s, with modifications externally to her masts and internally with the addition of air conditioning and added private bathrooms.  She was taken out of service in 1976 after fuel oil prices rose sharply in the preceding years, and sailed from Southampton for scrapping in Taiwan in April.

She had a passenger capacity of 755—214 in first class and 541 in tourist class—and a crew of 400.

References

Ships of the Union-Castle Line
1947 ships
Ships built by Harland and Wolff